"The Love Song" is a song co-written and recorded by American country music artist Jeff Bates.  It was released in December 2002 as the lead single from his debut album Rainbow Man, released on RCA Nashville.  The song was also Bates' highest-charting single on the Hot Country Singles & Tracks (now Hot Country Songs) chart, reaching a peak of #8.  Bates wrote this song with Kenny Beard and Casey Beathard.

Content
The song is a mid-tempo ballad accompanied by piano and a string section, with electric guitar solos preceding the second verse and bridge. In it, the male narrator recalls various instances in his life where love was involved. These include being held by his mother as a young child, playing baseball with his father, meeting his girlfriend next door, marrying her and finally, seeing the birth of their child.

Critical reception
Rick Cohoon of Allmusic gave the song a favorable review, comparing Bates' vocal delivery to that of Conway Twitty. Of the lyrics, he said, that they "[appealed] to that almost universal moment when our heart does flip-flops for another and finally to the magic of bringing a child into the world."

Chart positions
"The Love Song" debuted on the Hot Country Singles & Tracks charts dated for the week ending January 4, 2003. It spent thirty weeks on the charts and reached a peak of number 8.

Year-end charts

References

Jeff Bates songs
2002 debut singles
2002 songs
Songs written by Casey Beathard
Song recordings produced by Scott Hendricks
RCA Records Nashville singles
Songs written by Kenny Beard
Songs written by Jeff Bates